Christiane Haßloch (born Christiane Keilholz: 16 July 1764 - 23 August 1829) was a German stage actress and opera singer (coloratura soprano).

Life 
Christiane Magdalena Elisabeth Keilholz was born in Pirna, a mid-sized town a short distance up-river from Dresden.Her father was the actor Philipp Christian Keilholz (1735–1800).   It may have been as a result of her parents' theatrical backgrounds that she made her stage debut in 1769, the year of her fifth birthday. While she was growing up she made repeated stage appearances with her sister Dorothea, her brother Adolf Philipp Christian and her parents.   There were engagements in Hamburg (1776/77 and 1780-1783), in Braunschweig and Lüneburg (1777-1779) and in Münster. Between 1784 and 1786, now without their parents, she and her sister Dorothea had singing engagements at the Hamburg State Theatre (as it was then known).   Here, according to one commentator, those who heard her could not praise highly enough the "melodious and wonderful timbre of this beautiful singer" ("melodischen herrlichen Gesang dieser schönen Sängerin").

In 1786 the sisters joined the theatre company of Gustav Friedrich Wilhelm Großmann and Christian Wilhelm Klos. Under the music director August Burgmüller the company gave its performances in the larger Rhineland cities, notably Cologne, Düsseldorf, Bonn and Aachen. The company broke up in 1787, and during the 1789/90 season she played at the Bonn Court Theatre which had re-opened (after a five-year closure for mourning, following the death of the late Archbishop-Elector) in January 1789, and where the young Ludwig van Beethoven played the viola in the theatre orchestra.

By May 1790 she had left Bonn and joined the National Theatre in Mannheim where she made her debut as Constanze, the lead role in Mozart's opera, Seraglio. She remained at Mannheim till April 1792, when she moved to Amsterdam to undertake some engagements at the "German Theatre" ("Deutsches Theater") there. Leaving Mannheim at short notice involved breaking her agreement, and she was obliged to pay a contractual penalty of 100 ducats when she returned to Mannheim in August 1792.  In 1793 she went back to Amsterdam, this time accompanied by the tenor Karl Haßloch whom she married.

Between 1795 and 1804 she worked with her husband in Kassel. There is an indication in one source of his having been in charge of the theatre company. There was then an extensive tour of Germany after which, in 1809, she withdrew completely from theatre work for a year. She then moved to the newly created Darmstadt Theatre, where she worked as a singer-actress and where she was appointed Court Actress ("Hofschauspielerin "). She withdrew to private life, this time permanently, in 1818.

References 

1764 births
1829 deaths
People from Pirna
People from the Electorate of Saxony
German operatic sopranos
German stage actresses